Verica Bakoc (born May 3, 1999) is a Canadian water polo player who plays for Mediterrani and for the Canada women's national team.

Career highlights

Youth competitor 
Bakoc was part of the USC Trojans side that finished first in the 2018 NCAA Women's Water Polo Championship, second in 2019 and first in 2021.

As a youth competitor, Bakoc won silver at the 2015 Pan American Championship, bronze at the 2017 FINA Intercontinental Tournament, gold at the 2016 Pan American Championship and competed for Canada at the 2019 World University Games and at the 2019 FINA Junior World Championships.

Senior competitor 
Bakoc was part of the Ethnikos Piraeus side that won the 2021–22 Women's LEN Trophy. She represented Canada at the 2022 World Aquatics Championship.

References

External links
 FINA profile

Living people
1997 births
Canadian female water polo players
Canadian people of Serbian descent
University of Southern California alumni
USC Trojans women's water polo players
Competitors at the 2019 Summer Universiade
Ethnikos Piraeus Water Polo Club players